The English women's cricket team toured the West Indies in 2009, playing a total of three women's One Day Internationals and three women's Twenty20 Internationals in the space of eight days.

Touring party
England's touring party was announced in September 2009, with first-choice wicket-keeper Sarah Taylor rested and batsman Claire Taylor choosing to miss the tour with work commitments. The Kent wicket-keeper Tammy Beaumont was called up to the national squad for the first time.

Full touring party:

Charlotte Edwards (captain)
Caroline Atkins
Tammy Beaumont (wicket-keeper)
Katherine Brunt
Holly Colvin
Lydia Greenway
Isa Guha

Jenny Gunn
Danielle Hazell
Laura Marsh
Beth Morgan
Ebony-Jewel Rainford-Brent
Nicki Shaw
Anya Shrubsole

One Day International series

Twenty20 International series

References

External links
Series page from Cricinfo

England 2009
Women 2009
West Indies 2009
International cricket competitions in 2009–10
West Indies 2016
2009 in English women's cricket
2009 in West Indian cricket
2009 in women's cricket